Paul Schutzer (1930 – 5 June 1967) was an American photojournalist for Life magazine, famous for his "The Blunt Reality of the War in Vietnam" cover photo. He died on assignment while embedded with Israeli troops on the first day of the Six-Day War.

References

1930 births
1967 deaths
20th-century American photographers